A bicolor cat or tuxedo cat is a cat with white fur combined with fur of some other color, for example black or tabby. There are various patterns of bicolor cat. These range from Turkish Van pattern (color on the crown of the head and the tail only) through to solid color with a throat locket.

Where there is low-to-medium grade white spotting limited to the face, paws, throat and chest of an otherwise black cat, they are known in the United States as a tuxedo cat. High-grade bicolor results in Van-pattern cats. There are many patterns between, such as "cap-and-saddle", "mask-and-mantle" and "magpie" (more randomly splashed). Bicolors are found in many cat breeds, as well as being common in domestic longhair and domestic shorthair cats.

Mostly-solid-color bicolor cats occur because there is a white spotting gene present along with a recessive allele of the agouti gene, which evens out the usual striped pattern of the colors of the coat. In contrast, tabby cats have an agouti gene that produces striping of the coat. The Abyssinian has agouti (ticked tabby) fur, giving the appearance of even color with color-banded hairs

White spotting can also occur with any of the tabby patterns, resulting in tabby and white bicolors. Colorpoint (Himalayan pattern) cats can have bicolor points, although this variation is not recognized for showing. The body markings of bicolor colorpoints become clearer with age, as the body fur of colorpoint cats darkens as the cats grow older and the white patches become more visible.

Bicolor cats that are black and white are sometimes called "magpies". The cream and white bicolor cat is the rarest of the bicolors, while the black and white or "blue" (grey) and white are the most common.

Grades and frequency in breeds

Bicoloration in cats is graded from one to ten with one being completely black and ten being completely white. There are also several patterns with their own names. The cat labelled "bicolor" is the preferred pattern in show-quality bicolor purebred cats. The Cat Registry Fédération Internationale Féline (FIFe) states that for a "standard" bicolor coat to compete in shows: “the color patches must be clearly separated from each other, even in color and harmoniously distributed. At least ½ should be colored, but not more than ⅞; the rest is white.” In comparison, The Cat Fancier Organization (CFA) says that “cats with no more than a locket and/or button [patch on chest] do not qualify for this color class.”

Another type of black-and-white bicolor cat is referred to as a "cow cat" or "moo cat" and includes the magpie, cap-and-saddle and mask-and-mantle patterns. A cat cow does not have the solid black "jacket" of the tuxedo cat. Instead, it has large black patches over a mostly white body, often with a black mask over the head. "Black-mask cats" are so called because they look like they are wearing a black mask over their head.

The Turkish Van (white and red) is one good example of a bicolor breed. Van pattern is known to animal geneticists as the Seychelles (Seychellois) pattern and is classified into three variants:
 Seychellois Neuvieme is white with colored tail and head splashes (classic Turkish Van pattern)
 Seychellois Huitieme is white with colored tail and head splashes plus additional splashes of color on the legs
 Seychellois Septieme is white with splashes of color on the legs and body in addition to those on the head and the colored tail

These are high grade white spotting of types nine, eight and seven.

This coloration is not restricted to a specific breed of cat, as it can be found in many different types of pure-breed as well as mixed-breed domestic cats. However, some breeds are especially noted for having bicolor coats in their breed standards. These include the Turkish Van, American Shorthair, Manx, British Shorthair, and Turkish Angora.

In contrast, other common breeds of cat have specific coat patterns specified in their breed standards. Cats with such specific coat patterns include the Russian Blue, which has a coat of one solid color.

Genetics of coat patterns

The basic colors and patterns of cat fur are defined by fewer than ten genes. Cats with white color in their coats are thought to have a mutant white-spotting gene that prevents the formation of coat color in patches over the cat's body. This gene has been investigated in several species, particularly mice, and is co-dominant to normal coat color as it prevents the migration of melanocytes into the developing hair follicles. The genetics of this pattern are not as well understood in cats but at least some of the genes involved in melanocyte migration and survival may play a role similar as in other animals.

Three genotypes possible with the S (white spotting) gene, with capital S standing for a wild-type copy and lower-case s standing for the mutant.

 SS (two dominant alleles) results in high grades of white spotting (sometimes resulting in a solid-looking white cat or a white cat with just a few color hairs)
 Ss (one dominant, one recessive allele) results in medium grades of white spotting
 ss (two recessive alleles) results in solid color or low grades of white spotting (sometimes as little as a few white hairs)

The lack of tabby striping in bicolor cats is controlled by the agouti protein, which inhibits the production of melanin and thus prevents the formation of dark hair colors. In agouti cats the gene is turned on and off as the hair grows, producing hairs with alternating stripes yellow and black. In domestic cats, inactivation of the agouti gene by a deletion mutation causes all-black coat color.

Tuxedo

A tuxedo cat, or Felix cat  or Julius cat  is a bicolor cat with a white and black coat. They are called "tuxedo" cats because they appear to be wearing the type of black tie formal wear commonly known in the United States and Canada as a tuxedo. The tuxedo pattern is not limited to the color black, but the name is typically reserved for black and white cats. Most tuxedo cats are also black-mask cats, a common name for felines who, due to their facial coloration, look as if they are wearing a black mask over their eyes, and often over their entire head. To be considered a true tuxedo cat, the feline's coloring should consist of a solid black coat, with white fur limited to the paws, belly, chest, throat, and often the chin - sometimes the tail, although many tuxedo cats appear to sport goatees, due to the black coloration of their mandible: the lower jaw and chin. Bicolor may also appear in the skin color. Paw pads may be black or pink, often matching the coat in that area; if the color boundary crosses the underside of the paw, the pads on either side may be different colors or even bicolored. White muzzles or vertical stripes are a common attribute of tuxedo cats.

In popular culture

In the United Kingdom, the tuxedo cat became depicted as the "Jellicle cat" in the fictional tribe of nocturnal black and white cats described by T. S. Eliot in Old Possum's Book of Practical Cats, which was first published in 1939. In its derivative musical "Cats", the tuxedo cat is exemplified by the character of the magical Mr. Mistoffelees, who is portrayed as a stage magician wearing a lacy ruff and bow tie, as well as the character Bustopher Jones whose outfit consists of a tuxedo and spats. The musical differed from the book in that the characters included cats with many different coat colors, rather than just bicolor cats, but it retains the repeated assertion that "Jellicle cats are black and white." Cats with these markings also played a starring role in the drawings illustrating The Unadulterated Cat, a book written by Terry Pratchett, with cartoons by Gray Jolliffe.

Other well-known cartoon bicolor cats include Sylvester the Cat, Felix the Cat, Tom Cat from Tom and Jerry, Oggy from Oggy and the Cockroaches, Cat from The Cat that Hated People and Ventriloquist Cat, Krazy Kat, Jess from Postman Pat, Kitty Softpaws from the Shrek spin-off Puss in Boots, Figaro, Beans and Sebastian the cat from Josie and the Pussycats. A bicolor cat named Mittens is one of the main characters in the 2008 Disney animated film Bolt. Aldwyn from The Familiars is a tuxedo cat, while Meowrice (voiced by Paul Frees) from Gay Purr-ee is a bicolor. A tuxedo cat is also the protagonist of the popular children's book Tip-Top Cat, and another is one of the ten breeds of cats in the video game Minecraft. Morgana, a playable character in the JRPG Persona 5, is a bicolor cat. Bo, a character from the TV series Abby Hatcher, is a Fuzzly who resembles a tuxedo cat. Klonoa, the main character of the titular Klonoa games, closely resembles a tuxedo cat.

Known tuxedo cats 
 Salem, the tuxedo cat from the television series Sabrina, the Teenage Witch: Salem is a tuxedo cat that appears in the television series Sabrina, the Teenage Witch. Although an animated character, Salem became a popular figure among fans of the series and became a symbol of the popularity of tuxedo cats.
 Tilly, Actress Audrey Hepburn's Tuxedo Cat: Tilly was Audrey Hepburn's tuxedo cat for many years and became a popular figure in her own right. Tilly was known for her charisma and personality, and was frequently seen in photographs and interviews with Hepburn.

See also
 Palmerston, black & white bicolor, resident Chief Mouser of the Foreign & Commonwealth Office, Whitehall London
 Kat Kong, a children's book about a bicolor cat
 Penelope Pussycat, a cartoon character who is a bicolor cat

References

External links
 

Cat coat types